Vihualpenia is a genus of moths in the family Gracillariidae. It contains only one species, Vihualpenia lithraeophaga, which is found in southern central Chile.

The length of the forewings is 1.0–1.1 mm . The forewings are brown-silver, the apical area dark cooper-ferruginous with a white semicircular band and a white mark. The hindwings are uniform grey-silver.

The larvae feed on Lithraea caustica. They mine the leaves of their host plant. Young larvae create a serpentine mine. Older larvae create a patch shape mine. The larvae have a white to light brown body and a light brown head.

Etymology
The first two letters of the genus name are derived from the name Viviane, in honour to Dr. Viviane Jerez. The remaining part of the genus name derives from the type locality.

References

Acrocercopinae
Monotypic moth genera
Gracillarioidea genera
Moths described in 2013
Endemic fauna of Chile